Paratoxodera pluto is a species of praying mantis found in Malaysia and Sumatra.

See also
List of mantis genera and species

References

Mantidae
Insects of Indonesia